The Little Kesagami River is a river in northern Cochrane District in Northeastern Ontario, Canada. It is part of the James Bay drainage basin, and is a right tributary of the Kesagami River.

The river begins at Little Kesagami Lake just west of Ontario Highway 652 and flows north to its mouth at the Kesagami River. The Kesagami River flows via the Harricana River to James Bay.

See also
List of rivers of Ontario

References

Sources

Rivers of Cochrane District